Making It is an American reality competition television series, co-hosted by Amy Poehler and Nick Offerman. The series aired from July 31, 2018 to August 26, 2021, on NBC.

The show features craftspeople skilled in different media competing to be named the "Master Maker" and win $100,000. Each week, competitors make two handmade projects—a "Faster Craft" and a "Master Craft." The winner of each challenge earns a patch. For the Faster Craft, makers have three hours to create an item. For the Master Craft, they have a longer time to create a more elaborate themed collection. At the end of every episode, one person is sent home based on their performance in the Master Craft.

Cast

Hosts
 Amy Poehler
 Nick Offerman

Judges
 Dayna Isom Johnson
 Simon Doonan

Shop Master
 Jimmy DiResta

Contestants

Season 1

Season 2

Season 3

Production

On March 28, 2017, it was announced that NBC had straight-to-series ordered the unscripted "Crafts Competition Reality Series" with the working title, The Handmade Project from Amy Poehler's Paper Kite Productions. It was also announced that it would be hosted by Poehler and Nick Offerman.

In October 2017, NBC announced that the show would be called Making It and named the show's two judges, Dayna Isom Johnson and Simon Doonan. NBC later announced that the show would premiere on July 31, 2018.

On August 21, 2018, NBC renewed the series for a second season, which premiered on December 2, 2019, for the holidays and aired over two weeks.

On January 11, 2020, NBC renewed the series for a third season which premiered on June 24, 2021.

On May 16, 2022, NBC shelved the series indefinitely.

Contestant progress

 (FAST) The Contestant won that episode's Faster Craft Challenge.
 (WIN) The Contestant won that episode's Master Craft Challenge.
 (BOTH) The contestant won both that episode's Faster Craft Challenge and Master Craft Challenge.
 (OUT) The Contestant won that episode’s Faster Craft Challenge but was eliminated from the competition during the Master Craft Challenge.
 (OUT) The Contestant was eliminated from the competition.
 (SAFE) The Contestant won neither the Faster Craft Challenge nor Master Craft Challenge, and they were not eliminated.
 (WINNER) The Contestant was named Master Maker.
 (RUNNER UP) The contestant was runner up.
 (WINNER) The Contestant won the Faster Craft Challenge and was then named Master Maker.
 (RUNNER UP) The contestant won the Faster Craft Challenge and was then named a runner up.

Episodes

Season 1 (2018)

Season 2 (2019)

Season 3 (2021)

Ratings

U.S. Nielsen ratings

Season 1

Season 2

Season 3

Baking It 

In May 2021, Peacock announced that a spin-off show Baking It with a six-episode run has been ordered. It features teams of two talented home bakers. Poehler, Nicole Yaron, Pip Wells, Kate Arend and Dave Becky serve as executive producers. Maya Rudolph and Andy Samberg served as hosts for the first season. The series premiered on December 2, 2021. In October 2022, the series was renewed for a second season, which premiered on December 12, 2022. Amy Poehler replaced Samberg as co-host.

International version

In October 2020, Australia's Network 10 announced at their annual upfronts they would be making a local version of the show for Australian audiences in 2021. The show is co-produced by NBCUniversal International Studios' Matchbox Pictures and Eureka Productions. The series is hosted by comedians Susie Youssef and Harley Breen, and judged by production designer and art director Deborah Riley and paper engineer Benja Harney. The series premiered on Network 10 on September 15, 2021. In October 2021, it was announced that the series had been cancelled, with the final episode airing on November 6, 2021.

References

External links
 Making It on NBC.com
 

2010s American reality television series
2018 American television series debuts
2020s American reality television series
2021 American television series endings
Arts and crafts television series
English-language television shows
NBC original programming
Television series by 3 Arts Entertainment
Television series by Paper Kite Productions
Television series by Universal Television
Reality competition television series